Chopin Ridge is a ridge running north–south and rising to  between Lions Rump and Low Head, King George Island, South Shetland Islands. It was named by the Polish Antarctic Expedition to King George Island in the years 1977–79 after Frédéric Chopin, the Polish composer.

References
 

Poland and the Antarctic
Ridges of King George Island (South Shetland Islands)